Jilakin Lake is an ephemeral salt water lake found about  east of Kulin in the Wheatbelt region of Western Australia.

The lake is situated adjacent to Jilakin Rock.

See also

References

Jilakin